Stepney railway station is a disused railway station on the York and North Midland Railway's Victoria Dock Branch Line in Stepney, Kingston upon Hull, East Riding of Yorkshire, England. It was first opened on 8 May 1848 and closed in November 1854. It was reopened on 1 June 1864, before closing permanently on 19 October 1964.  Located on the Victoria Dock Branch Line which looped around the old part of the city one could catch trains to the seaside resorts of Hornsea or Withernsea.  Tickets were purchased in the small wooden building opposite the station building.  Diesels took over from steam in January 1957.  After the station closed, the lines through it were still used for goods trains until 1968. The few trains still travelling across Hull were diverted to the high level ex Hull and Barnsley Line which looped the city further north.

The station house is now a grade II listed building.  An old map of the area shows coal and timber sidings to the south of the station building.

References

External links

Disused railway stations in Kingston upon Hull
Grade II listed buildings in the East Riding of Yorkshire
Railway stations in Great Britain opened in 1848
Railway stations in Great Britain closed in 1964
Former York and North Midland Railway stations
Beeching closures in England
Hull and Holderness Railway
Hull and Hornsea Railway
Grade II listed railway stations